Casey Sherman is a New York Times, USA Today, and Wall Street Journal Bestselling American author, journalist and screenwriter most famous for his 2009 book The Finest Hours, which was adapted into the big budget  Walt Disney Studios (division) 2016 film of the same name, and Boston Strong, which was adapted into the acclaimed 2016 film Patriots Day.

Life and career
Sherman was born in Hyannis, Massachusetts. He attended Barnstable High School and graduated from Fryeburg Academy in 1988. He studied at Boston University, graduating in 1992.

As a television news producer for WBZ-TV, Sherman led a high-profile re-investigation of his aunt's murder, which he later chronicled in his 2003 book, A Rose for Mary: The Hunt for the Real Boston Strangler.  Sherman's work suggests that his aunt, 19-year old Mary Sullivan, might not have been a victim of the Boston Strangler, as commonly believed. Sherman wrote the New York Times Best-seller The Finest Hours in 2009, co-authored with Michael J. Tougias. The book was developed into the 2016 motion picture of the same name. It was filmed in Quincy, Massachusetts, and Chatham, Massachusetts, for Walt Disney Pictures. The Craig Gillespie-directed film stars Chris Pine, Casey Affleck, and Eric Bana. Sherman's other books include Bad Blood, Black Irish, Black Dragon, and Boston Strong: A City's Triumph Over Tragedy. The latter, about the city's response to the Boston Marathon bombing, was adapted as a feature dramatic film, Patriots Day (2016), starring Mark Wahlberg, Nina Dobrev, Jake Picking, Candice King, Alyssa Diaz, Kat Graham, James Harvey Ward, Stephen Amell, Paul Wesley and Alex Mckenna directed by Peter Berg.

Sherman also co-wrote The Ice Bucket Challenge: Pete Frates and the Fight against ALS and the New York Times Best-seller 12: The Inside Story of Tom Brady's Fight for Redemption with Dave Wedge. Both books are now in development as major motion pictures, as is Sherman's 2013 true crime drama, Animal: The Bloody Rise and Fall of the Mob's Most Feared Assassin with 20th Century FOX.

In 2018, Sherman reunited with Michael J. Tougias to write the Cold War drama Above & Beyond: John F. Kennedy and America's Most Dangerous Cold War Spy Mission.

In 2020, Sherman co-wrote the acclaimed true-crime thriller Hunting Whitey: The Inside Story of Capture & Killing of America's Most Wanted Crime Boss with Dave Wedge and partnered with James Patterson to write the New York Times Best-seller The Last Days of John Lennon, also with Dave Wedge.

Sherman is also a member of the famed Whydah Gally investigative team. In 2018, Sherman led an expedition to Devon, England to locate a blood relative of legendary pirate captain Samuel Bellamy and obtain their DNA for comparison to a human bone discovered in the shipwreck by Barry Clifford. The bone was examined by forensic scientists at the University of New Haven and deemed not a match. But the sample of  Bellamy's DNA has been preserved for future analysis of at least six new skeletal remains recently found in the shipwreck. The DNA investigation is ongoing and could take several years.

Sherman is represented by The Gotham Group in Los Angeles. He has appeared as a guest analyst on CNN, FOX News, NBC's Today Show, Discovery, History, Travel Channel, Dateline NBC, CBS Evening News, ABC World News Tonight, and others.

Sherman is a contributing writer for The Washington Post, Esquire (magazine), FOX News.com, Boston Magazine, Boston Common,, The Huffington Post and worked as a weekly featured columnist for The Boston Herald. In 2018 Sherman, and Dave Wedge, announced the formation of Fort Point Media, a film/TV/streaming content production company based in Boston and Los Angeles.

Works

Novels 

 Black Irish (2007)
 Black Dragon (2008)

Non-fiction 

Articles
 "The Way Back" (2014, with Dave Wedge), in Esquire
 "President Trump Needs to Learn Something about Diplomacy - and Fast" (2018) in The Washington Post 
 "Blood in the Water" (2019) in Boston Magazine
 "Cape Fear" (2020) in Boston Magazine
Biographies
 The Ice Bucket Challenge: Pete Frates and the Fight against ALS (2017, with Dave Wedge)
 The Last Days of John Lennon (2020, with James Patterson and Dave Wedge. 
True events
 A Rose for Mary: The Hunt for the Real Boston Strangler (2003) 
 Search for the Strangler: My Hunt for Boston's Most Notorious Killer (2005)
 The Finest Hours: The True Story of the U.S. Coast Guard's Most Daring Sea Rescue (2009, with Michael J. Tougias)
 Young Readers Edition: The Finest Hours (2014)
 Bad Blood: Freedom and Death in the White Mountains (2009)
 Animal: The Bloody Rise and Fall of the Mob's Most Feared Assassin (2013)
 Boston Strong: A City's Triumph over Tragedy (2015, with Dave Wedge)
 12: The Inside Story of Tom Brady's Fight for Redemption (2018, with Dave Wedge)
 Hunting Whitey: The Inside Story of the Capture & Killing of America's Most Wanted Crime Boss (2020, with Dave Wedge)

History
Above & Beyond: John F. Kennedy and America's Most Dangerous Cold War Spy Mission (2018, with Michael J. Tougias)

Adaptations 

 The Finest Hours (2016), film directed by Craig Gillespie, based on non-fiction book The Finest Hours: The True Story of the U.S. Coast Guard's Most Daring Sea Rescue

Awards
Emmy Award (nominated)
2010 Truth & Justice Award
2010 Massachusetts Book of the Year finalist (for The Finest Hours)
2010 New Hampshire Literary Prize finalist (for "Bad Blood")
2014 Junior Library Guild selection (for "The Finest Hours")
2016 Imaginnaire Award (Imagine Magazine)  
2018 Massachusetts Book of the Year finalist (for Above & Beyond)

References

1. Lauren Beckham Falcone, Time Spent with Finest Hours Writer Casey Sherman The Boston Herald, June 16, 2009
2. Laura Raposa There Will Be Bad Blood The Boston Herald, April 4, 2010

External links
 
"Hunting the Killer", Thomas Fields-Meyer People, November 27, 2000, Vol. 54, No. 22
http://video.foxnews.com/v/3937063/the-finest-hours/
http://bostonherald.com/track/inside_track/view.bg?articleid=1244510
http://www.boston.com/sports/media/2018/12/19/netflix-pete-frates-life-movie
https://deadline.com/2018/08/blackkklansman-charlie-wachtel-david-rabinowitz-boston-mob-film-thacher-island-fox-2000-joe-the-animal-barboza-greg-berlanti-sarah-schechter-1202439113/
https://www.bostonglobe.com/arts/books/2018/04/17/when-cuban-missile-crisis-almost-became-war/ND2IsVQ2mB1XnVfqVkaqJJ/story.html
https://www.wbur.org/artery/2020/12/04/james-patterson-last-days-of-john-lennon
https://variety.com/2019/tv/news/whitey-bulger-tv-series-sky-studios-double-nickel-fort-point-1203355797/

1969 births
Living people
American non-fiction crime writers
People from Hyannis, Massachusetts
Fryeburg Academy alumni